Curborough and Elmhurst is a civil parish in the district of Lichfield, Staffordshire, England.  The parish contains eight listed buildings that are recorded in the National Heritage List for England.  All the listed buildings are designated at Grade II, the lowest of the three grades, which is applied to "buildings of national importance and special interest".  The parish contains the small settlements of Elmhurst and Curborough and the surrounding countryside.  The listed buildings consist of houses and farmhouses, a corn mill, a water pumping station, and two mileposts.


Buildings

References

Citations

Sources

Lichfield District
Lists of listed buildings in Staffordshire